Reza Shah-Kazemi (b. 1 June 1960 ᴄᴇ) is an author who specializes in comparative mysticism, Islamic Studies, Sufism and Shi'ism. He is the founding editor of the Islamic World Report and currently a research associate at the Institute of Ismaili Studies with the Department of Academic Research and Publications. 
He received degrees in International Relations and Politics at Sussex and Exeter University, before receiving his doctorate in Comparative Religion from the University of Kent in 1994. He later acted as a consultant to the Institute for Policy Research in Kuala Lumpur.

Bibliography

 Imam 'Ali: Concise History, Timeless Mystery (I.B. Tauris, 2022) 
 Interpreting the 'Spirit of Assisi': Challenges to Interfaith Dialogue in a Pluralistic World (Vesuvius Press, 2013)  [contributor]
 The Spirit Of Tolerance in Islam (Bloomsbury Publishing, 2012) 
"Loving Compassion in Islam and Buddhism: Rahma and Karunā", Religions-Adyan, Issue 1, 2011 [contributed article]
Common Ground Between Islam and Buddhism (Independent Publishing Group, 2010)  [contributor]
The Sacred Foundations of Justice in Islam (World Wisdom, 2007) 
The Underlying Religion: An Introduction to the Perennial Philosophy (World Wisdom, 2007)  [contributed article]
My Mercy Encompasses All: The Koran's Teachings on Compassion, Peace and Love (Shoemaker & Hoard, 2007) 
Justice and Remembrance: Introducing the Spirituality of Imam Ali (I. B. Tauris, 2007) 
Paths to Transcendence (World Wisdom, 2006) 
Sufism: Love and Wisdom (World Wisdom, 2006)  [contributed article]
The Other in the Light of the One: The Universality of the Qur'an and Interfaith Dialogue (Islamic Texts Society, 2006) 
Paths to the Heart (World Wisdom, 2004)  [contributed article]
Seeing God Everywhere: Essays on Nature and the Sacred (World Wisdom, 2004)  [contributed article]
Islam, Fundamentalism, and the Betrayal of Tradition (World Wisdom, 2004)  [contributed article]
Doctrines of Shi`i Islam: A Compendium of Imami Beliefs and Practices (I. B. Tauris, 2001) 
Algeria: Revolution Revisited (Islamic World Report) (I. B. Tauris, 1998) 
Avicenna (Heroes from the East) (Hood Hood Books Ltd, 1997) 
Crisis In Chechnia (Islamic World Reports) (Isbs, 1996) 
Bosnia (Islamic World Reports) (Isbs, 1996) 
Turkey (Islamic World Reports) (Isbs, 1996)

See also
Institute of Ismaili Studies
Sufism
The Matheson Trust

External links
 Life and Work
Institute of Ismaili Studies Profile

Articles
Defining Without Confining: reflections on a prophetic usage of sacred space
Recollecting the Spirit of Jihad
Eckhart’s Image of the Eye and the Wood: An analogy which explains ‘all that I have ever preached about’
A Message of Hope at the Eleventh Hour: Martin Lings, 1909-2005

References

Alumni of the University of Kent
Alumni of the University of Sussex
Alumni of Exeter College, Oxford
British Islamic studies scholars
Living people
Sufi writers
Traditionalist School
Year of birth missing (living people)